Marcien Jenckes is the President, Advertising for Comcast.

Early life and education 
Marcien Jenckes was born in Wichita, Kansas. As a child he also lived in Spain.

Jenckes holds a MBA from the University of Virginia Darden School of Business and a BA in Economics and Political Science from New York University.

Career
Jenckes began his career at the Federal Reserve Bank of New York. Afterwards he worked at McKinsey & Company in Washington, DC in the Media & Technology practice. In 2001, he joined AOLas Senior Vice President, Messaging Communities and worked with the AIM and ICQ Brands and launched its advertising-financed consumer portal www.aol.com. Then he was the president of the Media and Content divisions of Grab Networks and before that he was the Chief Executive Officer for Voxant, Inc, a privately held new media company based in Reston, Virginia. Voxant and Anystream merged to form Grab Networks. In 2010 he joined Comcast. At Comcast, Jenckes was EVP, Consumer Services at Comcast Cable, where he oversaw the company’s video, Internet, voice and xfinity home businesses. In 2017, Jenckes overtook Comcast’s ad-technology division as part of an operational restructuring that followed the company’s wave of acquisitions. In 2018 Jenckes was promoted to president, advertising at Comcast Cable, where he is responsible for all of the company’s advertising assets and operations, including Comcast Spotlight.

References

External links
 Voxant gets a new CEO
 Comcast Promotes Marcien Jenckes to President, Advertising, May 5, 2017

American chief executives in the media industry
University of Virginia Darden School of Business alumni
New York University alumni
Living people
McKinsey & Company people
Date of birth missing (living people)
Year of birth missing (living people)